Onchiodon is an extinct genus of temnospondyl. It is primarily known from the Carboniferous and Permian of Europe, but also from the Permian of North America. It was an amphibious carnivore.

A number of species have been described:

References

Eryopids
Prehistoric amphibian genera
Carboniferous temnospondyls of Europe
Permian temnospondyls of Europe
Permian temnospondyls of North America
Fossil taxa described in 1861